Ryley Dunn (born 7 October 1985) is a former midfielder or defender for the Fremantle Football Club. He was drafted to Fremantle in the 2003 AFL Draft at selection 10, which was traded by Hawthorn Football Club in return for Trent Croad.  As a junior, he played for the Murray Bushrangers in country Victoria and was twice named All-Australian at under-18 level.

Dunn immediately made his debut in Round 1 2004 against Carlton. However he only played 1 more game for the year due to collarbone, knee and hamstring injuries.  2005 wasn't any more productive, with only a further 2 AFL games. Despite the many injuries, in mid-2005 he extended his contract with Fremantle to the end of the 2008 season.

When not selected for Fremantle or injured, Dunn played for the East Fremantle Football Club in the WAFL.

Ryley was delisted by Fremantle on 22 October 2007, but redrafted onto the Fremantle rookie list in November to fulfil the final year of his contract.  Midway through the year, he was elevated onto the senior list and played three games. However, Dunn was once again delisted at the end of the 2008 season.  In total he only managed 8 games for Fremantle over five seasons, but has played over 50 for East Fremantle and continues to play for them in 2009.

References

External links
 
 
 WAFL Player Profile

1985 births
Living people
Fremantle Football Club players
East Fremantle Football Club players
Australian rules footballers from Victoria (Australia)
Murray Bushrangers players